The Mongarlowe River is a perennial river of the Shoalhaven catchment located in the Southern Tablelands region of New South Wales, Australia. It was also known as Little River, during the 19th century.

Location and features
The river descends  over its  course.

The river is crossed by the Kings Highway northwest of Clyde Mountain. There are other road crossings at Monga, Mongarlowe and Marlowe.

The river has a translocated population of the endangered Macquarie Perch (Macquaria australasica). It is thought that this population descends from fish from the Murray-Darling Basin and not the eastern sub-species native to other parts of the Shoalhaven catchment. In recent years, this population seems to be in decline and may be doomed to local extinction.

See also

 
 List of rivers in New South Wales (L-Z)
 Monga National Park
 Rivers of New South Wales

References

Rivers of New South Wales
Southern Tablelands
Shoalhaven River